Rusalka Glacier is the 8 km long and 4.6 km wide glacier on Velingrad Peninsula, Graham Coast on the west side of Antarctic Peninsula, situated northeast of Hoek Glacier.  It drains the west slopes of Mount Paulcke, and flows northwestwards into Dimitrov Cove in Harrison Passage.

The glacier is named after the Bulgarian Black Sea resort of Rusalka.

Location
British mapping in 1971.

Maps
 British Antarctic Territory.  Scale 1:200000 topographic map. DOS 610 Series, Sheet W 65 64.  Directorate of Overseas Surveys, Tolworth, UK, 1971.
 Antarctic Digital Database (ADD). Scale 1:250000 topographic map of Antarctica. Scientific Committee on Antarctic Research (SCAR). Since 1993, regularly upgraded and updated.

References
 Bulgarian Antarctic Gazetteer. Antarctic Place-names Commission. (details in Bulgarian, basic data in English)
 Rusalka Glacier. SCAR Composite Gazetteer of Antarctica

External links
 Rusalka Glacier. Copernix satellite image

Bulgaria and the Antarctic
Glaciers of Graham Coast